Hero of a Hundred Fights is a Wisconsin rock band. 

The band takes its name from a painting by J. M. W. Turner. They emerged from the ashes of Brass Knuckles for Tough Guys, Tintoretto and Managra. Like those three bands, Hero of a Hundred Fights played a complex and ambitious style of hardcore, combining math rock influences with the lurching and propulsive rock assault of bands like Drive Like Jehu and Bitch Magnet. In 2000 William Zientara joined the band contributing vocals to their final EP The Remote, the Cold, recorded at Electrical Audio Recording by Steve Albini. With this release the band further refined their sound creating four powerful and dynamic songs combining fierce layered vocals, lurching time changes, snaking guitar lines and a pounding rhythm section. Disbanding late in 2001 members went on to join Haymarket Riot, Call Me Lightning, Murder in the Red Barn and Temper Temper.

Members
Pat Fuller (guitar/vocals)
Shane Holchester (drums)
Chris Grove (bass/vocals) 
William Zientara (vocals) *joins in 2000, prior to this the band are a three-piece

Discography
Self Titled LP (1999) on 404 Records
'A Four Way Stop' (2000) on 404 Records 
'The Remote, the Cold' EP (2001) on Divot
'The Remote, the Cold' EP (2011 vinyl re-issue) on Forge Again Records

Rock music groups from Wisconsin